Alfred John Stanton (20 September 1825 – 11 December 1906) was a British Liberal Member of Parliament representing Stroud who was elected to the House of Commons of the United Kingdom on 18 May 1874.

His father, William Henry Stanton, was also MP for Stroud, from 1841 to 1852.

References

Liberal Party (UK) MPs for English constituencies
1825 births
1906 deaths
UK MPs 1874–1880